Igor Cássio Vieira dos Santos (born 30 June 1998), known as Igor Cássio, is a Brazilian footballer who plays for Tombense on loan from Porto B as a forward.

Career statistics

References

External links

1998 births
Living people
Footballers from Rio de Janeiro (city)
Brazilian footballers
Association football forwards
Botafogo de Futebol e Regatas players
FC Porto B players
Tombense Futebol Clube players
Campeonato Brasileiro Série A players
Liga Portugal 2 players
Brazilian expatriate footballers
Expatriate footballers in Portugal
Brazilian expatriate sportspeople in Portugal
People from Bedford Roxo